Lisa McMann (born February 27, 1968) is an American author and the creator of The Unwanteds and The Unwanteds Quests series for young readers and the WAKE trilogy for young adults.

McMann was born in Holland, Michigan and now lives in Tempe, Arizona. She graduated from Calvin College in 1990. Her first novel, WAKE, debuted on the New York Times best-seller list for children’s chapter books. She is also the author of FADE, which debuted on the New York Times best-seller list and remained there eleven weeks, and of GONE, the last book in the WAKE series, which was released February 2010.

McMann has published many short stories, including the creative nonfiction essay, “When You're Ten,” featured in Literary Mama, and the award-winning short story, “The Day of the Shoes,” in 2004. One year later, her story, “Like Waves on Rocks” was published in the Gator Springs Gazette. McMann's short stories are written for adult audiences while her novels are intended for young adults.

Awards
 “The Day of the Shoes” (short story): 2004 Templeton International Power of Purpose Award 
 WAKE: American Library Association 2009 Top Ten Quick Picks for Reluctant Young Adult Readers
 WAKE: 2008 Cybil Award Finalist
 WAKE: Abraham Lincoln Book Award Master List (IL)
 WAKE: Garden State Teen Book Award Nominee (NJ)
 WAKE: Gateway Readers Award Nominee (MO)
 WAKE: Georgia Peach Book Award Master List
 WAKE: IRA Young Adults’ Choices
 WAKE: Nevada Young Reader’s Award Nominee
 WAKE: Texas Tayshas Reading List
 WAKE:  Young Adult Reading Program Reading List Selection (SD)
 Cryer’s Cross: American Library Association 2012 Best Fiction for Young Adults
 Cryer’s Cross: American Library Association 2012 Quick Picks for Reluctant Young Readers
 Dead to You: American Library Association 2013 Quick Picks for Reluctant Young Readers
 Dead to You: IRA Young Adults’ Choices
 The Unwanteds: Maine Student Book Award Master Listt
 The Unwanteds: North Carolina Young Adult Book Award Nomineet
 The Unwanteds: Truman Reader Award Nominee (MO)t
 Crash: American Library Association 2014 Quick Picks for Reluctant Young Readers
 Crash: MSTA Reading Circle List
 Bang: MSTA Reading Circle List

Published works

Wake trilogy
 WAKE (2008)
 FADE (2009)
 GONE (2010)

The Unwanteds

The Unwanteds (2011)
 The Unwanteds: Island of Silence (2012)
 The Unwanteds: Island of Fire (2013)
 The Unwanteds: Island of Legends (2014)
 The Unwanteds: Island of Shipwrecks (2015)
 The Unwanteds: Island of Graves (2015)
 The Unwanteds: Island of Dragons (2016)

The Unwanteds Quests
 The Unwanteds Quests: Dragon Captives (2017)
 The Unwanteds Quests: Dragon Bones (2018)
 The Unwanteds Quests: Dragon Ghosts (2019)
 The Unwanteds Quests: Dragon Curse (2019)
 The Unwanteds Quests: Dragon Fire (2020)
 The Unwanteds Quests: Dragon Slayers  (2020)
 The Unwanteds Quests: Dragon Fury  (2021)

Visions trilogy
 Crash (2013)
 Bang (2013)
 Gasp (2014)

Going Wild series
 Going Wild (2016)
 Predator Vs. Prey (2017)
 Clash of Beasts (2018)

Other books
 Cryer’s Cross (2011)
 Dear Bully: Seventy Authors Tell Their Stories (2011)
 Dead To You (2012)
 The Trap Door (Infinity Ring #3) (2013)
 The Forgotten 5: Map of Flames

WAKE trilogy translations

The WAKE trilogy has been translated into the following languages (note: not all of the books are out in these countries):

Novo Seculo / Portuguese (Brazil only)
Wisdom Distribution Service / Chinese (complex)
Kelly Kiado / Hungarian
Newton Compton / Italian
Everest / Spanish
Atlin Kitaplar / Turkish
Patakis / Greek
PT Gramedia / Indonesian
Amarin / Thai
Boje Verlag / German
WYDAWNICTWO / Polish
Everest Editora / Portuguese (Portugal)

Personal life
Lisa is married to fellow writer and musician, Matt McMann, and they have two adult children. Her son is an artist named Kilian McMann and her daughter is an actress, Kennedy McMann. Kennedy was cast in Nancy Drew as the titular character, in the new CW series.

References

External links 
 Official web site

1968 births
Living people
21st-century American novelists
American women novelists
Writers from Mesa, Arizona
Writers from Phoenix, Arizona
People from Holland, Michigan
21st-century American women writers
Novelists from Arizona
Novelists from Michigan
Calvin University alumni